Steven Hutchinson (born May 18, 1949 in Vancouver) is a Canadian figure skater. He is the 1968 Canadian bronze medalist and 1965 Junior national champion. He placed 22nd at the 1968 Winter Olympics.

Competitive highlights

References

 Profile
 
 

1949 births
Canadian male single skaters
Figure skaters at the 1968 Winter Olympics
Olympic figure skaters of Canada
Living people
Figure skaters from Vancouver
20th-century Canadian people
21st-century Canadian people